Toka Natua (born 22 November 1991) is a New Zealand rugby footballer. She has represented New Zealand in rugby union and the Cook Islands in rugby league. She plays for the Blues Women in the Super Rugby Aupiki competition.

Rugby career

2015 
Natua made her debut for the New Zealand women's national rugby union team, the Black Ferns, in 2015 against Canada.

2017 
Natua scored a hat-trick and was also cited for foul play, in New Zealand's victory over England in the final of the 2017 Women's Rugby World Cup. She then represented the Cook Islands at the 2017 Women's Rugby League World Cup in Australia.

2019–20 
In 2019, she was part of the Black Ferns team that won the Women's Rugby Super Series. In 2020, she was named in the Black Ferns squad that took on the New Zealand Barbarians in Waitakere.

2023 
Natua joined the Blues Women for the 2023 Super Rugby Aupiki season. At the end of 2023, she will be joining her partner, Pita Gus Sowakula, and their one-year-old daughter in Clermont, France. She will be signing with the Clermont women’s side.

Personal life 
Natua is of Cook island descent and was born in Tokoroa. She is a graphic designer.

Honours
Women's Rugby World Cup: winner 2017

References

External link
Black Ferns Profile

1991 births
Cook Islands women's national rugby league team players
Living people
New Zealand female rugby league players
New Zealand women's international rugby union players
New Zealand female rugby union players
New Zealand sportspeople of Cook Island descent
Rugby league props